Jukka Lehtonen (born 22 February 1982) is a professional volleyball player from Finland who joins GFCO Ajaccio in French Ligue A for season 2010–2011. He is also the captain of Finland men's national volleyball team.

Career

Early career 

Lehtonen started his volleyball career in Rantasalmen Urheilijat year 1989. Ten years after that he played on fourth highest level in Finland. Two years after that he made contract Bad Saulgau team. He moved to Germany and started play their second highest level.

East Volley 

After one year in Germany he came back to Finland and started playing in Savonlinnan East Volley which played Finland volleyball league. He was two times with East Volley in medalgames, but when East Volley got many problems he changed to Napapiirin Palloketut.

Palloketut 

Season 2004–2006 Lehtonen played in Napapiirin Palloketut, Rovaniemi. He won season 2005 with team Finland Cup Champion. Media chose him to season 2005–2006 All-Stars team. After two season in Napapiirin Palloketut Lehtonen made contract with new club named Rovaniemen Santasport.

Santasport 

First season was success to Lehtonen in Santasport. He won Finland league Champion first time on his career. Santasport played too good games in European league. After season media chose Lehtonen again to All-Stars team. Second season was too good to Lehtonen and his team. Lehtonen got his second Finland Champion after very exciting finals. Media chose Lehtonen third time to All-Stars team.

Aris Thessalonik 

After season 2008 Lehtonen made contract with Aris Thessaloniki which play in Greece Volleyball league.

National team 

First time Jukka Lehtonen get to national team year 2006. He played good season in Finland league and team couch Mauro Berruto wanted Lehtonen to his team. Lehtonen played his first national team match against Canada in FIVB World league, and has altogether 61 appearances in the National Team. Since Tuomas Sammelvuo retired from the Finnish National Team, he has been the captain of the team.

Achievements

Personal 

 Finland league All-Stars team 2006, 2007, 2008
 Sport Channel All-Stars team 2008
 Best blocker in Finland league 2007, 2008
 Play-off best blocker 2008
 Hotsport.info All-Stars team 2008

Team 

 Finland Champion 2007, 2008
 Finland Cup Champion 2005
 Swiss Champion 2013
 Swiss Cup Champion 2013

Teams 

 2001–2004 Savonlinnan East Volley
 2004–2006 Napapiirin Palloketut
 2006–2008 Rovaniemen Santasport
 2008–2009 Aris Thessalonik
 2009–2010 ITA Marcegaglia Ravenna
 2010–2011 GFCO Ajaccio
 2011–2012 Città di Castello A2 Italy
 2012–2013 EN Gas & Oil Lugano
 2013–2014 Energy Investments Lugano

References

Finnish men's volleyball players
People from Savonlinna
1982 births
Living people
Finnish expatriate sportspeople in Greece
Finnish expatriate sportspeople in Italy
Sportspeople from South Savo
Expatriate volleyball players in Greece
Expatriate volleyball players in Italy
Expatriate volleyball players in France
Expatriate volleyball players in Switzerland
Finnish expatriate sportspeople in Switzerland
Finnish expatriate sportspeople in France